Alfredo Stroessner Matiauda (3 November 1912 – 16 August 2006) was a Paraguayan army officer and dictator who served as President of Paraguay from 15 August 1954 to 3 February 1989.

Stroessner led a coup d'état on 4 May 1954 with the support of the army and the Colorado Party, with which he was affiliated. After a brief provisional government headed by Tomás Romero Pereira, he was the Colorado Party's presidential candidate for the 1954 general election, and was elected unopposed since all other parties were banned.

He officially assumed the presidency on 15 August 1954, quickly suspended constitutional and civil rights, and began a period of harsh repression with the support of the army and the military police (which also served as a secret or political police) against anyone who opposed his authoritarian rule. Even when opposition parties were legalized in 1962, they were barely tolerated, and the repression continued. On 25 August 1967, he introduced a new constitution enabling him to re-elect himself; in 1977 he modified that constitution to permit himself to be re-elected indefinitely. He was fraudulently re-elected seven times from 1958 until 1988; approximately six months after the 1988 general election, he was overthrown in the coup d'état of 2 and 3 February 1989, led by his most trusted confidant, Major General Andrés Rodríguez Pedotti, with the support of the army.

On 5 February 1989, just two days after the coup, Stroessner was exiled to Brazil, where he spent the last 17 years of his life. He died at 11:20 AM on 16 August 2006 at the Santa Luzia Hospital in Brasilia from septic shock due to complications from pneumonia.  He was veiled in a strict private ceremony, and finally buried in the Campo da Esperança Cemetery.

Early life
Stroessner's parents were Hugo Strößner, who emigrated from Hof, Bavaria, Germany, and worked as an accountant for a brewery, and Heriberta Matiauda, who grew up in a wealthy Paraguayan family of Criollo Spanish descent. Stroessner was born  in Encarnación on 3 November 1912. He enrolled in the Francisco López Military Academy in 1929, and received his commission as a lieutenant in the Paraguayan Army in 1931.

In 1932, he fought against Bolivian forces in the Battle of Boquerón during the Chaco War. After the war he rose steadily in rank; by 1940, he had risen to the rank of major and joined the general staff in 1946. When the Paraguayan Civil War broke out in 1947, he commanded the artillery division at Paraguarí that ensured that President Higinio Morínigo won the war by destroying a working-class rebel area of Asunción. President Morínigo found Stroessner's military skills very useful and promoted him rapidly. As one of the few officers who had remained loyal to Morínigo, Stroessner became a formidable political and social player once he entered the higher echelons of the Paraguayan armed forces. He became a brigadier — and the youngest general officer in South America — in 1948. His accurate political sense failed him only once, when he found himself in 1948 on the wrong side of a failed coup attempt and had to be driven to the Brazilian embassy in the trunk of a car, earning him the nickname of "Colonel Trunk". Stroessner backed Felipe Molas López in a successful coup against Juan Natalicio González. He then backed Federico Chávez against Molas López and by 1951 he was Commander-in-chief of the Armed forces of Paraguay.

Dictatorship (1954–1989)

Stroessner objected to President Federico Chávez's plans to arm the national police and threw him out of office in a coup on 4 May 1954. After a brief interim presidency by Tomás Romero, Stroessner was the only candidate in a special election on 11 July to complete Chávez's term. He was reelected seven times—in 1958, 1963, 1968, 1973, 1978, 1983 and 1988. He appeared alone on the ballot in 1958. In his other elections, he won by implausibly high margins; only once (1968) did he drop below 80 percent of the vote. That campaign was also the only time an opposition candidate got more than 20 percent of the vote. He served for 35 years, with only Fidel Castro having a longer tenure among 20th-century Latin American leaders; though Castro's tenure as president was shorter at 32 years (1976–2008).

Soon after taking office, Stroessner placed the entire country under a state of siege and suspended civil liberties. The state-of-siege provisions allowed the government to arrest and detain anyone indefinitely without trial, as well as forbid public meetings and demonstrations. It was renewed every 90 days until 1987, except for a brief period in 1959. Although it technically only applied to Asunción after 1970, the courts ruled that anyone charged with security offenses could be brought to the capital and charged under the state-of-siege provisions—even if the offense took place outside the capital. Apart from one 24-hour period on election days, Stroessner ruled under what amounted to martial law for nearly all of his tenure. A devoted anti-communist who brought Paraguay into the World Anti-Communist League, he justified his repression as a necessary measure to protect the country.

The Stroessner regime's strong anti-communist stance earned it the support of the United States, with which it enjoyed close military and economic ties and supported the U.S. invasion of the Dominican Republic. The Stroessner regime even offered to send troops to Vietnam alongside the Americans. The United States played a "critical supporting role" in the domestic affairs of Stoessner's Paraguay. Between 1962 and 1975 the US provided $146 million to Paraguay's military government and Paraguayan officers were trained at the U.S. Army School of the Americas. Although the military and security forces under Stroessner received less material support from the United States than other South American countries, strong inter-military connections existed through military advisors and military training. Between 1962 and 1966, nearly 400 Paraguayan military personnel were trained by the United States in the Panama Canal Zone and on US soil. Strong Paraguayan-U.S. relations continued until the Carter Administration emphasized a foreign policy that recognized human rights abuses, although both military and economic aid were allotted to the Paraguayan government in Carter's budgets. The Reagan Administration restored more cordial relations due to Stroessner's staunch anti-communism, but by the mid 1980s relations cooled, largely because of the international outcry over the regime's excesses, along with its involvement in narcotics trafficking and money-laundering. In 1986, the Reagan administration added his regime to its list of Latin American dictatorships.

As leader of the Colorado Party, Stroessner exercised nearly complete control over the nation's political scene. Although opposition parties were nominally permitted after 1962 (the Colorado Party had been the only legal party in the country since 1947), Paraguay remained for all intents and purposes a one-party state. Elections were so heavily rigged in favor of the Colorados that the opposition had no realistic chance of winning, and opposition figures were subjected to varying degrees of harassment. Furthermore, Stroessner's Paraguay became a haven for Nazi war criminals, including Josef Mengele, and non-communist peaceful opposition was crushed. Given Stroessner's affinity for Nazism and harboring of Nazi war criminals, foreign press often referred to his government as the "poor man's Nazi regime".

Stroessner's rule brought more stability than most of the country's living residents had previously known. From 1927 to 1954, the country had had 22 presidents, including six from 1948 to 1954 alone. However, that stability came at a high cost. Corruption was rampant (Stroessner himself did not dispute charges of corruption at some levels in his government) and Paraguay's human rights record was considered one of the poorest in South America. During Stroessner's regime, an estimated 3,000 to 4,000 people were murdered, 400 to 500 more "disappeared," and thousands more imprisoned and tortured.

Press freedom was also limited, constitutional guarantees notwithstanding. Any outcry about government mistreatment or attacks toward the Colorado Party would result in destruction of the media outlets. Many media executives were sent to prison or tortured. Because of this, political opponents were few and far between. Near the end of this presidency, he declared that he would remove the state of siege, but quickly recanted after students began protesting trolley fares.

For the first 13 years of his rule, Stroessner ruled under a severely authoritarian constitution enacted in 1940.  It was replaced in 1967 with an equally repressive document. Like its predecessor, it gave the president broad powers to take exceptional actions for the good of the country, such as suspending civil liberties and intervening in the economy. It thus formed the legal basis for the state of virtual martial law under which Stroessner governed. While it limited the president to two five-year terms, it stipulated that only those terms completed after the 1968 election would count toward that limit. In 1977, faced with having to leave office for good the following year, Stroessner pushed through a constitutional amendment allowing him to run for an unlimited number of five-year terms.

Operation Condor
Paraguay was a leading participant in Operation Condor, a campaign of state terror and security operations officially implemented in 1975 which were jointly conducted by the military dictatorships of six South American countries (Chile, Argentina, Bolivia, Paraguay, Uruguay and Brazil) with the support of the United States. Human rights violations characteristic of those in other South American countries such as kidnappings, torture, forced disappearances and extrajudicial killings were routine and systematic during the Stroessner regime. Following executions, many of the bodies of those killed by the regime were dumped in the Chaco or the Río Paraguay. The discovery of the "Archives of Terror" in 1992 in the Lambaré suburb of Asunción confirmed allegations of widespread human rights violations.

Pastor Coronel was the chief of the Department of Investigations, or secret police. He would interview people in a pileta, a bath of human vomit and excrement, or ram electric cattle prods up their rectums. In 1975, the Secretary of the Paraguayan Communist Party, was dismembered alive with a chainsaw while Stroessner listened on the phone. The screams of tortured dissidents were often recorded and played over the phone to family members, and sometimes the bloody garments of those killed were sent to their homes.

Under Stroessner, egregious human rights violations were committed against the Aché Indian population of Paraguay's eastern districts, largely as the result of U.S. and European corporations wanting access to the country's forests, mines and grazing lands. The Aché Indians resided on land that was coveted and had resisted relocation attempts by the Paraguayan army. The government retaliated with massacres and forced many Aché into slavery. In 1974, the UN accused Paraguay of slavery and genocide. Only a few hundred Aché remained alive by the late 1970s. The Stroessner regime financed this genocide with U.S. aid.

Stroessner was careful not to show off or draw attention from jealous generals or foreign journalists. He avoided rallies and took simple holidays in Patagonia. He became more tolerant of opposition as the years passed, but there was no change in the regime's basic character.

During Stroessner's rule, no socialist nations had diplomatic relations with Paraguay, with the sole exception of non-aligned Yugoslavia. Stroessner made many state visits, including to Japan, the United States, and France, as well as to South Africa, a country which Paraguay developed close bilateral ties with in the 1970s. He also made several visits to West Germany, although over the years his relations with that country deteriorated. Since he had always been known as pro-German, this worsening of relations, combined with his feeling that the U.S. had abandoned him, was regarded as a personal blow to Stroessner.

It has been asserted that the Roman Catholic Church is the only reason Stroessner did not have absolute control over the country. After the destruction of Asunción University in 1972 by police, the Archbishop of Paraguay Ismael Rolón Silvero excommunicated the minister of the interior and the chief of police, and proscribed the celebration of Holy Mass in a sign of protest against the Stroessner regime. When Pope John Paul II visited Paraguay in 1988, his visit bolstered what was already a robust anti-Stroessner movement within the country.

Stroessner gave a written television interview to Alan Whicker as part of a documentary called The Last Dictator (UK: 7 April 1970) for the television series Whicker's World. The programme was released in a Region 2 DVD box-set by the UK's Network imprint.

Economics
Stroessner dedicated large proportions of the Paraguayan national budget to the military and police apparatus, both fundamental to the maintenance of the regime. According to a 1963 article from Time magazine, Stroessner spent 33% of the 1962 annual budget on army and police, 15% for education, and just 2% for public works. There was no income tax and public spending was the smallest percentage of GDP in Latin America.

Stroessner enacted several economic development projects, including the building of the largest hydroelectric power plant in the world in Itaipu Dam, developing Paraguay's economy: although Paraguay received only 15% of the contracts, it was a major factor allowing the country to have the highest rate of growth in Latin America for most of the 1970s. The construction of the Itaipu Dam, as well as the subsequently built Yacyretá Dam on the Paraguay–Argentina Border, displaced thousands of Paraguayans, pushing them from their homes, often without any restitution. The Itaipu Dam displaced at least 80,000 Paraguayans, and the Yacyretá was estimated to have displaced at least that many by December 2008. 160 workers died building the Itaipu Dam.

Stroessner also promoted projects that purportedly developed the country's infrastructure. Amongst these were the improvement of highways and the issuing of 15–20 hectare land grants to military personnel upon completion of their service, provided that the land would be used for farming purposes. Over 10,000 soldiers took up this offer. By the end of the Stronato, the second biggest city was Puerto Flor de Lis (renamed "Puerto Presidente Stroessner," then "Ciudad del Este"), founded just 32 years before.

Downfall

In April 1987, Stroessner lifted the state of siege as part of the run-up to elections the following spring. However, several draconian security laws remained in effect, meaning that the substance (if not the form) of the state of siege was still in place. As had been the case for over three decades, opposition leaders continued to be arbitrarily arrested and opposition meetings and demonstrations were broken up (often brutally). Stroessner was nominated by the Colorados once again, and was the only candidate who was allowed to campaign completely unmolested. Under these circumstances, the February 1988 election was no different from past elections, with Stroessner officially registering 89 percent of the vote — a margin that his rivals contended could only have been obtained through massive fraud.

On 3 February 1989, only six months after being sworn in for what would have been his eighth full term, Stroessner was ousted in a coup d'état led by General Andrés Rodríguez, his closest confidant for over three decades. One reason for the coup was that the generals feared one of Stroessner's offspring would succeed him. Of the two, Alfredo (aka 'Freddie'), was a cocaine addict and Gustavo, a pilot, was loathed for being homosexual. A more outlandish rumour was that Lino Oviedo threatened Rodríguez with a grenade if he did not launch the coup. The two generals, Rodríguez and Oviedo, fought a brief artillery duel over Asunción.

Later life and death

After the coup, Stroessner fled to Brazil, where he lived in exile for the next 17 years.

The eastern city of Puerto Flor de Lis, which had been renamed Puerto Presidente Stroessner in his honour, in 1989 was again renamed Ciudad del Este. Asunción's airport had been named after him during his regime, but was later renamed Silvio Pettirossi International Airport.

Stroessner died on 16 August 2006, in Brasília, at the age of 93. The immediate cause of death was a stroke. He had been suffering from pneumonia after undergoing a hernia operation. The Paraguayan government preemptively dismissed any suggestions for honouring the late president within Paraguay. He tried to return to Paraguay before his death, to die in his homeland, but he was rebuked and threatened with arrest by the government.

In part due to Stroessner's abuses, Paraguay's current constitution limits the president to a single five-year term with no possibility of reelection, even if nonsuccessive. The ban on any sort of reelection has become so entrenched in Paraguayan politics that in 2017, when the legislature debated an amendment that would have allowed then-president Horacio Cartes to run for reelection, massive protests forced the Colorados to abandon those plans.

Family

Marriage and children 
Stroessner was married to Eligia Mora (26 December 1910 – 3 February 2006). They had three children: Gustavo, Alfredo and Graciela. Alfredo Domínguez Stroessner, son of Graciela, was a senator. The couple were forcibly separated after his exile; she fled to the US, while he was given asylum in Brazil. Although they stayed in touch by phone and occasionally met up, they were unable to live together, and neither Stroessner nor his son were able to return to Paraguay to attend her funeral.

Extramarital affairs 
Stroessner engaged in extramarital affairs before and during his presidency. According to many sources, some of his affairs were with teenage girls as young as 13, and he may have fathered over 30 illegitimate children. The affairs were divulged after his downfall, further tarnishing his image.

References

Bibliography

Further reading

CIA: Stroessner's Paraguay

External links

Obituary BBC News
Paraguay's archive of terror
The Presidential Papers of Dwight D. Eisenhower Official letter to President Stroessner (1959)
Paraguay seeks Stroessner return
ObituaryThe Guardian
Alfredo Stroessner, 93, Old-Style Military Dictator of Paraguay
Obituary The Economist
Stroessner, Paraguay's Enduring Dictator, Dies The New York Times 
Gen. Alfredo Stroessner, Colorful Dictator of Paraguay for 35 Years, Dies in Exile at 93

 
1912 births
2006 deaths
People from Encarnación, Paraguay
Paraguayan people of German descent
Paraguayan people of Spanish descent
Leaders ousted by a coup
Leaders who took power by coup
Operation Condor
Opposition to Fidel Castro
Paraguayan anti-communists
Paraguayan soldiers
People of the Chaco War
People of the Cold War
Presidents of Paraguay
Colorado Party (Paraguay) politicians
Paraguayan exiles
Exiled politicians
Far-right politics in South America
Recipients of the Order of the Liberator General San Martin
Paraguayan emigrants to Brazil
Politicide perpetrators
Military personnel of the Cold War
Deaths from sepsis